Just Call Me Lonesome may refer to:
Just Call Me Lonesome (Ernest Tubb album), 1963
Just Call Me Lonesome (Slim Whitman album), 1961
"Just Call Me Lonesome" (Eddy Arnold song)
"Just Call Me Lonesome" (Radney Foster song)